Sumati Shatakam (Telugu: సుమతీ శతకము) is one of the most famous Telugu Shatakam. It is a neeti (moral) Shatakam.

Sataka Karta (Sataka Creator) 
Sumati Satakam is composed of more than a 100 poems (padyalu).
According to many literary critics Sumati Satakam was reputedly composed by Baddena Bhupaludu (AD 1220-1280). He was also known as Bhadra Bhupala. He was a Chola prince and was a Vassal under the Kakatiya empress Rani Rudrama Devi during the thirteenth century. He was a pupil of Tikkana, a Telugu writer. If we assume that the Sumatee Satakam was indeed written by Baddena, it would rank as one of the earliest Satakams in Telugu along with Vrushadhipa Satakam of Palkuriki Somanatha and Sarveswara Satakam by Yathavakkula Annamayya. The Sumatee Satakam is also one of the earliest Telugu works to be translated into European languages. Sri Riasat Ali Taj (1930-1999), poet, critic, writer, linguist & translator from Karimnagar has made poetic translations (Manzoom Tarjuma in Urdu Rubaiyaat) published in popular Urdu magazines and news papers in early 1950s.

Features
Sumati Satakam has been extremely popular for a long time with parents and teachers who try to teach the right conduct and social values to young children. The language used is very simple. The poems have the musical quality of classical meters. Most of the words are simple Telugu. The use of Sanskrit words is very limited. There are hardly any words unfamiliar to modern readers. Since the Telugu used by the author is so close to what the common people used, the poems look surprisingly familiar to the users of the Telugu. The poems have an astonishing communication power. All the poems are in kanda padyam meter. Being in short meter and being unconnected to each other the poems are easy to remember. Even if one does not remember the entire poem, it is commonplace to quote some gem like statements from the Satakam. Each generation of school children learns some of them during elementary and high schools.

External links
Open Source Audio by Dr. Goli Anjaneyulu.
Sumati Satakam Versions: Adyar Library
Sumati Satakam Versions: Charles Philip Brown
Sumati Satakam Transcription, Andhra Pradesh State Oriental Manuscript Library and Research Institute

Telugu-language literature
Indian poetry collections